Louis Henry Fletcher Balmain (17 January 1858 – 1904) was a cricketer who played one match of first-class cricket for Nelson in New Zealand in the 1880-81 season.

Batting at number three, Balmain made 50 and 40, the two highest scores on either side in the drawn match against Wellington on the last two days of 1880. One newspaper described Balmain’s 50 as "the best innings seen on the Wellington ground for a long time". It was one of only two individual scores of 50 or more for Nelson in their 17 first-class matches.

He married Laura Harris in Dereham, Ontario, Canada, on 10 September 1884. She died of tuberculosis in Oxford, Ontario, on 7 July 1897. He is believed to have died in Canada in 1904.

References

External links

1858 births
1904 deaths
Nelson cricketers
Sportspeople from Bath, Somerset
English emigrants to New Zealand